The 2015–16 Colorado Avalanche season was the 21st operational season and 20th playing season since the franchise relocated from Quebec prior to the start of the 1995–96 NHL season. As well as the franchise's 37th season in the National Hockey League and 44th season overall. The Avalanche celebrated their 20th anniversary this season.

The Avalanche were unable to make the playoffs for the second consecutive year.

Standings

Schedule and results

Pre-season

Regular season

Player statistics
Final stats
 
Skaters

Goaltenders

†Denotes player spent time with another team before joining the Avalanche. Stats reflect time with the Avalanche only.
‡Traded mid-season
Bold/italics denotes franchise record

Suspensions/fines

Notable achievements

Awards

Milestones

Transactions
The Colorado Avalanche were involved in the following transactions during the 2015–16 NHL season.

Trades

Free agents acquired

Free agents lost

Claimed via waivers

Lost via waivers

Lost via retirement

Player signings

Draft picks

Below are the Colorado Avalanche's selections at the 2015 NHL Entry Draft, to be held on June 26–27, 2015 at the BB&T Center in Sunrise, Florida.

Draft notes

 The San Jose Sharks' second-round pick went to the Colorado Avalanche as the result of a trade on June 27, 2015 that sent Buffalo's second-round pick in 2015 (31st overall) to San Jose in exchange for Colorado's second-round pick in 2016, Colorado's sixth-round pick in 2017 and this pick.
 The Colorado Avalanche's fifth-round pick will go to the Montreal Canadiens as the result of a trade on June 30, 2014 that sent Daniel Briere to Colorado in exchange for P. A. Parenteau and this pick.

References

Colorado Avalanche seasons
Colorado Avalanche season, 2015-16
Colorado Avalanche
Colorado Avalanche